Events from the year 1884 in Canada.

Incumbents

Crown 
 Monarch – Victoria

Federal government 
 Governor General – Henry Petty-Fitzmaurice 
 Prime Minister – John A. Macdonald
 Chief Justice – William Johnstone Ritchie (New Brunswick)
 Parliament – 5th

Provincial governments

Lieutenant governors 
Lieutenant Governor of British Columbia – Clement Francis Cornwall 
Lieutenant Governor of Manitoba – James Cox Aikins 
Lieutenant Governor of New Brunswick – Robert Duncan Wilmot  
Lieutenant Governor of Nova Scotia – Matthew Henry Richey    
Lieutenant Governor of Ontario – John Beverley Robinson   
Lieutenant Governor of Prince Edward Island – Thomas H. Haviland (until July 18) then Andrew Archibald Macdonald
Lieutenant Governor of Quebec – Théodore Robitaille (until October 4) then Louis-Rodrigue Masson

Premiers 
Premier of British Columbia – William Smithe 
Premier of Manitoba – John Norquay 
Premier of New Brunswick – Andrew George Blair
Premier of Nova Scotia – William Thomas Pipes (until July 15) then William Stevens Fielding (from July 28)
Premier of Ontario – Oliver Mowat
Premier of Prince Edward Island – William Wilfred Sullivan 
Premier of Quebec – Joseph-Alfred Mousseau (until January 23) then John Jones Ross

Territorial governments

Lieutenant governors 
 Lieutenant Governor of Keewatin – James Cox Aikins
 Lieutenant Governor of the North-West Territories – Edgar Dewdney

Events
January 2 – "Humber Railway Disaster" 32 men and boys were killed upon the head-on collision of a Grand Trunk Railway commuter train with an unscheduled freight train No. 42C near Toronto. Most of the dead were workers being transported on the freight train to the Ontario Bolt Works in Swansea, Ontario.
January 10 – David Scott elected as the first mayor of Regina
January 17 – The Parliament Building's new electric lights were turned on, for the first time.
January 23 – John Jones Ross becomes premier of Quebec, replacing Joseph-Alfred Mousseau.
 June 22 –  The seven surviving members of the 25-man Lady Franklin Bay Expedition, led by Adolphus Greely, are rescued by Winfield Scott Schley. One more died on the homeward journey.
July 28 – William Fielding becomes premier of Nova Scotia, replacing William Pipes.
September 15 – The Nile Voyageurs depart for Africa
October 15 – The La Presse newspaper is founded
November 7 – Calgary is incorporated as a town, changing its name from Fort Calgary
Parliament of Canada passes the Indian Advancement Act, encouraging democratic elections of chiefs. Mohawks at St. Regis, Ontario, resist the provision, preferring their traditional method of choosing leaders.

Births

January to June
February 10 – Rork Scott Ferguson, politician (d.unknown)
February 18 – Andrew Watson Myles, politician (d.1970)
April 6 – Walter Huston, actor (d.1950)
April 12 – Maurice Brasset, politician and lawyer (d.1971)
April 30 – Murdoch Mackay, politician (d.1963)
May 1 – Henry Norwest, sniper in World War I (d.1918)
June 11 – William George Bock, politician (d.1973)

July to December
July 25 – Davidson Black, paleoanthropologist (d.1934)
August 27 – John Edward Brownlee, politician and 5th Premier of Alberta (d.1961)
September 2 – Angus MacInnis, politician (d.1964)
September 27 – Silby Barrett, labour leader
December 15 – James Macdonnell, soldier, lawyer and politician (d.1973)

Deaths
January 14 – Pierre-Eustache Dostaler, farmer and politician (b.1809)
January 31 – Charles Dewey Day, lawyer, judge and politician (b.1806)
February 20 – Abram William Lauder, lawyer and politician (b.1834)

Full date unknown
John Ferris, businessman, explorer and politician (b.1811)

Historical documents
Opposition Leader Edward Blake touches on several Liberal Party principles and political points

Essay on disadvantages of Confederation for Manitoba

Winnipegger Alexander Begg lectures in London on his years in the Northwest

Report on Indigenous peoples of Northwest (Note: "savage," other stereotypes)

Witnesses describe tense stand-off between Mounties and armed group of Cree

Touring British scientists find Chief Crowfoot selling his personal items at Gleichen, Alberta

Louis Riel is asked to return from exile

Letter of Louis Riel declining invitation to speak in Prince Albert

Anglophone Quebeckers assess agricultural and forestry advantages of Calgary region

Newspaper controversy over encouraging deaf people to settle in Northwest

Nova Scotia woman writes to her mother about losing her newborn child

"A young man of unbounded enthusiasm," Ernest Thompson Seton becomes ornithology director at Canadian Postal College of the Natural Sciences

References 

 
Years of the 19th century in Canada
Canada
1884 in North America